The 2021 Fiesta Bowl was a college football bowl game played on January 2, 2021, with kickoff at 4:00 p.m. EST (2:00 p.m. local MST). It was the 50th edition of the Fiesta Bowl, and was one of the 2020–21 bowl games concluding the 2020 FBS football season. Sponsored by video game brand PlayStation, the game was officially known as the PlayStation Fiesta Bowl. The bowl was celebrating its 50th anniversary, having been first played in 1971.

Due to the COVID-19 pandemic in Arizona, it was announced in early December that the game would be played behind closed doors, with only players' family members admitted.

Teams
As one of the New Year's Six bowl games, the participants of the game were determined by the College Football Playoff selection committee. The committee matched Oregon of the Pac-12 Conference and Iowa State of the Big 12 Conference, in the first meeting between the two teams.

Oregon 

Oregon won the Pac-12 title after beating USC in the Pac-12 Championship Game on December 18, and received the conference's automatic bid to a New Year's Six bowl game. The team accepted a berth to the Fiesta Bowl on December 20, which was the program's third-ever Fiesta Bowl, after the 2002 and 2013 editions.

Iowa State 

Iowa State lost to Oklahoma in the Big 12 Championship Game on December 19. They were eligible for an at-large selection to a New Year's Six bowl game, being ranked 10th in the College Football Playoff rankings on December 20, and received and accepted an invitation to the Fiesta Bowl that day. This was both Iowa State's first-ever Fiesta Bowl and New Year's Six bowl appearance.

Game summary

Statistics

References

External links
 Game statistics at statbroadcast.com

Fiesta Bowl
Fiesta Bowl
Fiesta Bowl
Fiesta Bowl
Iowa State Cyclones football bowl games
Oregon Ducks football bowl games